Richard F. Colburn (born February 9, 1950), a Republican, is a former State Senator for District 37 in Maryland.

Background
Richard Colburn was first elected to the Maryland State Senate in 1994 to represent District 37, which covers Caroline, Dorchester, Talbot, and Wicomico Counties. In that year he defeated Democratic challenger Samuel Q. Johnson III and won the seat left open by Frederick C. Malkus, Jr., who retired after 47 years in the Maryland General Assembly.

In the 1998 election Colburn defeated his challenger, former Democratic state delegate Robert Alan Thornton, Jr. He captured 59% of the vote to Thornton’s 41%.

The election in 2002 saw challenger Grason Eckel manage to get 31% of the vote.  Colburn received almost 69% of the vote to go on and serve four more years.

In 2006, a year that saw many Republicans lose their seats all across the country, Colburn managed to keep his.  That year saw him defeat Democrat Hilary Spence, who received almost 39% of the vote to Colburn’s 56%.  Five percent of the vote was split between write-in candidates and Moonyene Jackson-Amis.

In November 2010, Senator Colburn was re-elected to his 5th term in the Maryland State Senate defeating Cambridge Attorney Chris Robinson.

Colburn is also a former member of the Maryland House of Delegates.  In his last election for the House in 1986, he won along with Democrats William S. Horne and Samuel Q. Johnson, III.  When Colburn ran for the State Senate, Republican Ken Schisler won the seat left open.

Education
Colburn graduated from Easton High School in Easton, Maryland in Talbot County.  He then received his A.A. degree in 1982 from Chesapeake College, located in Wye Mills, which straddles Talbot and Queen Anne’s Counties.

University of Maryland Eastern Shore
In 2005, a former aide of Colburn, Gregory Dukes, claimed to have written term papers for two sociology courses Colburn was taking at the University of Maryland Eastern Shore towards a bachelor's degree. Colburn withdrew from the school shortly after Dukes made his complaint to the University. Dukes also alleged that Colburn had asked his former aide and retired academic Conway Gregory to be an advisor for his course and that Gregory had rewritten one of his term papers. Colburn called Dukes a "disgruntled employee" and said he only asked Dukes to type out term papers he had already written and that he left the course because of the stresses of his work as a senator. The Joint Committee on Legislative Ethics of the Maryland General Assembly dismissed the complaint.

Career
After college, Colburn served in the U.S. Army Security Agency, achieving the rank of Sergeant. He served from 1969 until 1972. From 1967 to 1992 he was employed with A&P/SuperFresh. He has been the Town Manager for Federalsburg, Maryland in Caroline County since 1991. He belonged to the Dorchester County Republican State Central Committee from 1979 until 1982. He was selected to be a delegate to the Republican Party National Convention in 1988.

In 1992, Colburn was selected to serve on the Board of Directors for the Maryland Rural Water Association, an organization that "provides free technical services, training, and assistance to small drinking and waste water systems in the rural areas throughout the state of Maryland." He is a past vice-president of that organization.

Colburn, had been active in the People for Better Housing organization and was President of the Board of Directors.

Colburn belongs to several other organizations including the American Legion, the Veterans of Foreign Wars (VFW), the Zion United Methodist Church, and the Elks. He has received numerous awards including the Good Conduct Medal while serving his country in the military, the Social Science Award at Chesapeake College in 1980, and the Social Science Award at Eastern Community College in 1981.

In the Legislature
Prior to being elected to the Maryland State Senate, Colburn was a member of the Maryland House of Delegates. While serving in the House, he was a member of the Constitutional and Administrative Law Committee from 1983–86, the Environmental Matters Committee from 1987–91, and a member of the Governor's Committee on Employment of the Handicapped from 1984 until 1990. In addition, he was also on the Lead Poisoning Prevention Commission.

While in the Maryland Senate, Colburn served on the Education, Health and Environmental Affairs Committee from 2003–2010, the Joint Committee on Administrative, Executive and Legislative Review since 1996, the Joint Committee on the Chesapeake and Atlantic Coastal Bays Critical Area since 2003,the Executive Nominations Committee since 2008 and the Oyster Advisory Commission. He previously served as Chair of the Alcoholic Beverages subcommittee.  He currently serves on the Senate Budget and Taxation Committee, the Public Safety, Transportation and Environment subcommittee and the Capital Budget subcommittee.

Colburn previously served on the Judicial Proceedings Committee from 1995–2003; the Special Committee on Substance Abuse from 2001 until 2003. In 2004, he served on the Senate Special Commission on Medical Malpractice Liability Insurance and from 2006 until 2006, served on the Agricultural Stewardship Commission.

Colburn was the Senate Chair of the Eastern Shore Delegation, a committee he served from 1999 - 2015. He was a member of the Maryland Legislative Sportsmen's Caucus from 2001-2015, the Maryland Rural Caucus from 2002-2015, the Taxpayers Protection Caucus from 2003-2015, and finally the Maryland Veterans Caucus from 2004-2015.

Personal life
He was married to Alma Colburn. In 2014 she filed for divorce, alleging that he had a relationship with a former aide.

References

External links
 Maryland State Archives Senator Page

1950 births
20th-century Methodists
21st-century Methodists
21st-century American politicians
American United Methodists
Living people
Republican Party Maryland state senators
Republican Party members of the Maryland House of Delegates
People from Easton, Maryland
The Great Atlantic & Pacific Tea Company
University of Maryland Eastern Shore alumni